Ram Dass, Going Home is a 2017 short documentary portrait of Ram Dass. It was Shortlisted by the Academy of Motion Picture Arts and Sciences as a contender for the 2018 Academy Awards in Documentary Short Subject.

References

External links
 
 
 

2017 short films
Ram Dass